Deron Johnson is an American jazz keyboardist. Beginning at the age of sixteen, Johnson became hooked on jazz music and attended California State University, Long Beach where he continued his pursuit with private lessons from Billy Childs. In 1991, after touring with pop idol Paula Abdul, Johnson was discovered by the trumpeter Miles Davis. Johnson completed three European tours and two American tours with Davis before he died, and recorded the keyboards on his last CD  Doo-Bop (1992). Johnson then toured extensively and recorded with jazz bassist Stanley Clarke and alto saxophonist David Sanborn. In 1996, Johnson began to focus on original projects, along with more touring and more recordings with artists including Alanis Morissette, Boz Scaggs, and Seal.

Johnson has continued to write and record for television and began recording his first solo album Learning to Crawl.  He has also composed music for several QCODE podcasts, eventually becoming its Head of Music in 2020.

Discography

References

External links
 Deron Johnson at AllMusic.com

Living people
Year of birth missing (living people)
American jazz keyboardists
American jazz pianists
American male pianists
21st-century American keyboardists
21st-century American pianists
21st-century American male musicians
American male jazz musicians